Yan Maciel dos Santos (born March 24, 1997) is a Brazilian professional footballer who plays as a midfielder for CD Olimpia of Honduras.

References

External links
 

1997 births
Living people
Brazilian footballers
Brazilian expatriate footballers
Association football midfielders
Venados F.C. players
Goytacaz Futebol Clube players
Clube Atlético Penapolense players
Brazilian expatriate sportspeople in Mexico
Expatriate footballers in Mexico